The Phyllodactylidae are a family of geckos (Gekkota) consisting of over 150 species in 10 genera, distributed throughout the New World, North Africa, Europe and the Middle East. The family was first delineated based on a molecular phylogenetic analysis in 2008, and all members possess a unique single codon deletion in the phosducin (PDC) gene. The phyllodactylid genus Bogertia has been recently synonymized with Phyllopezus.

Genera
These genera are considered members of the Phyllodactylidae:

References 

Geckos
Lizard families